Barney and Smith Car Company was a railroad car manufacturer in Dayton, Ohio.

Founded in 1849 by Eliam Eliakim Barney and Ebenezer Thresher as Thresher, Packard & Company, it changed names as partners came and went:

 1850: E. Thresher & Company
 1854: Barney, Parker & Company - after Caleb Parker joined the firm
 1867: The Barney & Smith Manufacturing Company - joined by E.E. Barney, Preserved Smith, J.D. Platt, E.J. Barney and A.E.E. Stevens
 1892: The Barney & Smith Car Company

Barney & Smith faced challenges from bigger railcar makers in the late 1890s and early 1900s and went into receivership in 1913, when the Great Dayton Flood damaged its facilities; the company finally disappeared in 1921.

Products
 railway passenger cars
 electric street railways (trams or trolley cars)
 interurban railcars
 wooden cars for Metropolitan West Side Elevated Railroad in Chicago
 railroad chapel cars

See also
 List of rolling stock manufacturers

External links
 A History of the Barney & Smith Car Company
Barney and Smith Company

Defunct rolling stock manufacturers of the United States
Defunct companies based in Dayton, Ohio